Barhakune Daha (Nepali: ब्रहाकुने दह ) is a lake that lies in the Dang District, Nepal. This is situated in Ghorahi sub-metroploitan city- 07. This lies in north-west Mahabharat hilly regions’ arms. On the first of Magh (Nepali calendar), there helds the big fare.

People gather ashore the Barhakune Daha on the occasion of Maghe Sankranti

See also 
 List of lakes of Nepal

References

Lakes of Lumbini Province
Dang District, Nepal